Meyvaleh (also Romanized as Mayvaleh, Meywaleh, and Mīūleh) is a village in Kolyai Rural District, in the Central District of Asadabad County, Hamadan Province, Iran. At the 2006 census, its population was 506, in 117 families.

References 

Populated places in Asadabad County